Yeshiva Week is the informal term for a vacation period occurring annually in mid to late January, in which many Jewish day schools and yeshivas afford time off to their students. It is primarily a North American phenomenon.

Description
During Yeshiva Week, large numbers of Jewish families travel to various tourist destinations, traditionally in warmer climates such as Florida, Israel, Arizona, Mexico, The Poconos, and the Caribbean.

See also
Winter vacation

References

Unofficial observances
Types of tourism
Week-long events